Medha Vishram Kulkarni is an Indian politician and member of the Bharatiya Janata Party.

Political career
Kulkarni is a first term member of the Maharashtra Legislative Assembly from the  Kothrud assembly constituency in Pune where she won against Chandrakant Mokate of Shiv Sena. She is only one of the two women members in the Maharashtra Legislative Assembly from Pune and belonging to the Bharatiya Janata Party.

Positions held 

 Maharashtra Legislative Assembly from Kothrud.
 Terms in office: 2014–2019.

References 

Politicians from Pune
Bharatiya Janata Party politicians from Maharashtra
Maharashtra MLAs 2014–2019
Marathi politicians
21st-century Indian women politicians
21st-century Indian politicians
Living people
Year of birth missing (living people)
Women members of the Maharashtra Legislative Assembly